Northern James Calloway (September 10, 1948 – January 9, 1990) was an American actor and singer, best known for playing David on Sesame Street from 1971 to 1989. He was institutionalized in a psychiatric hospital and died less than eight months after his last appearance on the show.

Career

Theatre 
Calloway graduated from New York City's High School of Performing Arts and joined the Lincoln Center Repertory Company in 1966. There, he performed in A Midsummer Night's Dream (Stratford Festival, 1968) and The Three Musketeers (Stratford Festival, 1968). He played the lead in the New Federal Theater production of The Louis Armstrong Story.

He became a Broadway stage actor in 1968 appearing in Tiger at the Gates (Broadway, 1968) and The Me Nobody Knows (Broadway, 1970). He continued to act in stage productions in between filming a television series, performing in Pippin (Leading Player, Her Majesty's Theatre, London, 1973), Pippin (Leading Player, Broadway, 1976), and Whose Life Is It Anyway? (Broadway, 1980). Calloway performed in six productions on Broadway from 1968 to 1980.

Television 
In 1971, he joined the cast of Sesame Street during the show's second season as the character David Robinson, boyfriend of the character Maria Rodriguez (portrayed by Sonia Manzano). In 1982, after the death of fellow castmate and actor Will Lee, who was widely known for his portrayal of shopkeeper Mr. Hooper, the series decided to include his death in the show and have Calloway's character David become the new owner of Mr. Hooper's Store. He remained one of the few human characters in the series for eighteen years, appearing in 1,268 episodes.

Calloway appeared in several made-for-television movies and specials by the Children's Television Workshop for over eleven years, including Christmas Eve on Sesame Street (1978), A Special Sesame Street Christmas (1978), Don't Eat the Pictures (1983), and Put Down the Duckie (1988). In 1989, Calloway retired from the series for medical reasons. Viewers were told that his character had moved to Florida and thus would no longer appear on Sesame Street. Calloway also voiced the Muppet characters: the Hipster, modeled after James Brown imagining shapes; Baby Breeze; and the Sesame Street character Same Sound Brown.

Legal troubles, health problems and final years on Sesame Street
On the morning of September 19, 1980, Calloway was arrested in Nashville, Tennessee. He had been a guest in the home of Mary Stagaman, marketing director of the Tennessee Performing Arts Center, after performing there on the 13th. Calloway beat Stagaman with an iron, causing serious head and rib injuries. He then fled into the suburbs of Nashville, where he smashed a plate glass window and storm door at one house and did extensive damage to the interior of another, destroying the family's collection of fine crystal, smashing a television set, and breaking light bulbs with his bare hands. He also stole a backpack from a first grader, smashed a windshield with a rock, and stole a bag of herbicide from elderly resident Douglas Wright. Calloway spilled it on his body and was rolling on the ground and running around, at which point Wright attempted to hold Calloway at gunpoint and fired a warning shot at him, causing Calloway to dive to the ground and scream that he was shot. He then jumped up and washed his hands and face in the Wrights' birdbath before fleeing the scene, where witnesses reported him wearing only a Superman T-shirt. He was arrested after hiding out in a couple's garage, screaming, "Help! I'm David from Sesame Street and they're trying to kill me!" The actor was taken to a mental hospital for examination. These events were not publicized, and Calloway was allowed to continue appearing on the show as long as he sought help.

In his authorized history Street Gang: The Complete History of Sesame Street, author Michael Davis writes that Calloway's final years on the show were marked by periods of deteriorating health and ability punctuated by episodes of erratic behavior. During these years, he cites that Calloway reportedly bit music coordinator Danny Epstein during an on-set fight. Davis also states Calloway once appeared unannounced at Alison Bartlett's ("Gina" on Sesame) high school and proposed to her, despite him being 23 years her senior. Calloway's fellow cast members observed subtle clues to his erratic behavior and increasingly kept their distance. In addition, his criminal record caused him to be banned from Canada, where Follow That Bird was filmed; he is completely absent from the film.

By 1987, executive producer Dulcy Singer became increasingly doubtful about Calloway's future with the show. As a result, the writers gradually ended the relationship that the character of David had with Maria, which had been in the storyline for several years (Maria soon began a romance with Luis Rodriguez (Emilio Delgado), which resulted in their marriage in May 1988). Eventually, in the spring of 1989, Calloway was dismissed from Sesame Street by Singer, following the aforementioned incident with Danny Epstein. His final appearance was in the 20th season finale, which aired on May 12, 1989. In the following season, it was stated that David went to live with his grandmother on a farm to take care of her, as ownership of Hooper's Store was turned over to the character of Mr. Handford, played first by Leonard Jackson and later David Smyrl.

Mental health and death
Shortly after his termination from Sesame Street, Calloway was permanently placed into a mental institution called Stony Lodge Hospital, located in Ossining, New York. There, he received treatment for bipolar disorder.

On the afternoon of January 9, 1990, there was a violent altercation between Calloway and a staff physician. He was then taken to Phelps Memorial Hospital in North Tarrytown, where he was pronounced dead at the age of 41. A coroner's report listed Calloway's official cause of death as exhaustive psychosis, now more commonly called excited delirium syndrome (EDS), a "controversial condition" often retrospectively assigned to those who die under restraint in custody.

A prior marriage to Terri Calloway ended in divorce. At the time of his death, his mother Bunnetta Calloway and his brother Gregory Calloway, both of Manhattan, New York, and his sister Connie Calloway Jackson of Baltimore, Maryland, were still alive. He was buried in Ferncliff Cemetery.

Discography

Albums
1978: David, Daydreamin' on a Rainy Day (Sesame Street #CTW 25518)

Singles
1973: "Stop (If I'm Gonna Save Any Part Of My Love For You)" b/w "Heart Of Stone" (United Artists #UA-XW311-W)
1974: "Meant to Be" (United Artists #UA-XW401)
1976: "My Name Is David" b/w "Subtraction Blues" (Sesame Street #CTW 99019)
1978: "More of the Same" w. Linda Gache (Statler #S9000)

Filmography

Film

Television

References

Further reading

External links

 
 
 
 
 
 Davidson County Criminal Court

1948 births
1990 deaths
African-American male actors
Burials at Ferncliff Cemetery
20th-century American male actors
American male musical theatre actors
Fiorello H. LaGuardia High School alumni
American male film actors
American male television actors
20th-century American male singers
20th-century American singers
People with bipolar disorder
20th-century African-American male singers
Actors from New York City